The Ven. Henry Marriott was Archdeacon of Bermuda from 1925 until 1951.

He was educated at St Augustine's College, Canterbury and Hatfield College; and ordained in 1895. After curacies in Topsail, Newfoundland and Labrador and Hamilton, Bermuda he was Commissioner of the Diocese of Newfoundland and Bermuda before his appointment as Archdeacon.

He died in 1952, his son was the eminent cardiologist Henry J. L. Marriott.

References

Alumni of St Augustine's College, Canterbury
Alumni of Hatfield College, Durham
19th-century Anglican priests
20th-century Anglican priests
Archdeacons of Bermuda
1952 deaths
Year of birth missing